The AEK-971 (Russian: Автомат единый Кокшарова 971, "Rifle, common, of Koksharov, 971) is a selective fire 5.45×39mm assault rifle that was developed at the Kovrov Mechanical Plant (KMZ) by chief designer Sergey Koksharov in the late 1970s and 1980s (currently manufactured by Degtyarev Plant). AEK-973 is 7.62×39mm version.

The KORD 6P67 (formerly A-545) is a successor variant of the AEK-971 (KORD 6P68/A-762 being variant of AEK-973) that was announced on 23 December 2014, which features numerous internal and external improvements over its predecessor and was adopted by the Russian military for special forces.

History
The AEK-971 was developed to participate in a competition announced by the Ministry of Defense of the USSR, during which preference was given to the AN-94. The initial AEK version differs from modern samples, as many innovations were perceived as unnecessary by the Ministry of Defence, which led to a simplification of the early model. The AEK-971 is approximately  lighter than the AN-94, simpler in design and cheaper to manufacture.

The AEK-971 assault rifle has been combat proven in Chechnya tested by naval infantry and interior forces, and prepared for mass production. Only a few small batches of this assault rifle have been produced so far and adopted for service with units of the Ministry of Justice of the Russian Federation.

Though losing an initial contract for production against the AN-94 as a result of the Project Abakan assault rifle selection trials held from 1980 to 1994 in Russia, the Russian Army began field trials of this weapon. The AN-94 assault rifle, which was officially adopted by Russian army, has a slight accuracy edge over the AEK-971 in 2-round-burst mode. In full automatic mode or during longer bursts (3–10 rounds per burst) the AEK-971 is more accurate. In late 2014, an updated variant of the rifle passed state trials and will be tested operationally with Russian forces in early 2015.

On 23 December 2014, the Russian Army announced that a successor variant of the AEK-971 line, designated as the KORD 6P67 (official GRAU designation 6P67), along with their main rival the AK-12, had passed state Ratnik trials and would be accepted into service with operational units for evaluation. Both systems were recommended for initial batch production and issue for trials in the field. It is possible that in the end both rifles will be adopted by Russian military and other agencies, with the AEK series being oriented towards Special Operations Forces (Spetsnaz) and AK-12 towards  infantry and other units. It was expected that both rifles would be trialed operationally with the Russian Armed Forces by March 2015.

In March 2017, it was revealed that the KORD 6P67 would be accepted into Russian service after testing was completed along with the AK-12, although serving border patrol regiments, special forces, and the national guard due to its more complicated and expensive design while the AK-12 would arm regular infantry forces.
In January 2018 it was announced that the rifle has been adopted in 5.45×39mm and 7.62×39mm chamberings by the Russian military.

Design details

The AEK-971 is based on previous AK rifles in internal design and layout, but features a Balanced Automatics Recoil System (BARS) that enhances the traditional Kalashnikov long stroke gas piston operating system by reducing the negative effects of recoil. Balanced recoil systems were previously applied in the AO-38 and AL-7 experimental assault rifles and in the AK-107 and AK-108. BARS works by shifting mass toward the muzzle of the rifle as the bolt and bolt carrier recoil rearward by way of a counter-weight that negates the impulse of the gas piston and bolt carrier, resulting in more controllable automatic fire. For the AEK-971 automatic firing accuracy is improved by 15-20% in comparison with the AK-74M.

Each AEK assault rifle is fitted with a Warsaw Pact side-rail bracket for mounting optics.

The travel distance of the reciprocating parts of the AEK-971 is less than compared to the non-balanced recoil AK-pattern designs, thus increasing its cyclic rate of fire significantly. The original cyclic rate of fire of the early prototype model was 1,500 rounds per minute (RPM) and was later decreased to 900 rounds per minute (RPM) for the production model.

The AEK-971 is fed through standard 5.45×39mm 30-round or larger box magazines used by the AK-74, RPK-74 and other similar 5.45×39mm Russian weapons.

Variants
There are three main variants of the AEK assault rifles: the AEK-971, AEK-972 and AEK-973. The different variants are most easily recognized by their respective magazine curvatures. The AEK-971S and AEK-973S are improved variants of the AEK-971 and AEK-973 which features a three-round burst fire mode and numerous improvements. A heavily improved variant of the AEK-971 and AEK-973 lines' designated as KORD 6P67 and KORD 6P68 was later released and is set to be used in the Russian Special Operations Forces (Spetsnaz).

AEK-971 
The AEK-971 is chambered in 5.45×39mm. It uses all of the standard 5.45×39mm AK-74 and RPK-74 magazines.

AEK-971S 
An improved variant of the AEK-971 with a new trigger mechanism with the location of the thumb safety-selector lever on the right side, receiving additionally a three-shot burst fire mode, and an extended padded retractable lightweight stock. When the stock is retracted, the shoulder rest connects with the pistol grip forming a streamlined structure which allows the weapon to be used without hampering fire capabilities. The burst fire accuracy of the 5.45×39mm AEK-971S is two times higher than that of the 5.45×39mm AK-74M assault rifle.

AEK-972 
The AEK-972 is chambered in 5.56×45mm NATO. It uses the magazines of the 5.56×45mm NATO chambered arms of the AK-100 rifle family, the AK-101, AK-102 carbine, and AK-108.

AEK-973 
The AEK-973 is chambered in 7.62×39mm. It uses all of the standard 7.62×39mm AK-47, AKM and RPK magazines.

AEK-973S 
An improved variant of the AEK-973 with a new trigger mechanism with the location of the thumb safety-selector lever on the right side, receiving additionally a three-shot burst fire mode, and an extended padded retractable lightweight stock. When the stock is retracted, the shoulder rest connects with the pistol grip forming a streamlined structure which allows the weapon to be used without hampering fire capabilities. Burst fire accuracy of the 7.62×39mm AEK-973S is two times higher than that of the 7.62×39mm AKM assault rifle.

KORD assault rifle

KORD 6P67 

A successor variant of the AEK-971 line is designated as the KORD 6P67 (official GRAU designation 6P67), formerly A-545, and chambered in 5.45×39mm. The assault rifle features numerous internal and external improvements over earlier AEK-971 models. The changes includes iron sights that consist of a rotary rear drum aperture and a hooded front post creating a significantly longer sight line, an ambidextrous fire mode selectors/safety levers, a 2-round burst feature, retractable and adjustable shoulder stock. Also the Warsaw Pact side-rail bracket is omitted and replaced by a Picatinny Rail on a redesigned receiver top for mounting auxiliary equipment, such as optical red dot sights.
The first orders for the KORD 6P67 rifle were announced in mid-2020, after being adopted in 2018. It is believed these orders total about 500 assault rifles that were destined for Spetsnaz units and some Airborne personnel.

KORD 6P68 

A successor variant of the AEK-973 line is designated as the KORD 6P68 (official GRAU designation 6P68), formerly A-762, evidently a similar design to the KORD 6P67 but chambered in 7.62×39mm.

Users

 : AEK-971 rifles were produced in small batches and delivered to units of the MVD Internal Troops (paramilitary gendarmerie-like forces) and other law enforcement agencies of Russia. In January 2018 it was announced that the KORD 6P67 and KORD 6P68 rifles had been adopted in the 5.45×39mm and 7.62×39mm chamberings by the Russian military. Serial production begun in April 2020.

See also
AK-107/AK-108
AN-94
AK-12
AL-7
AO-38
List of Russian weaponry
List of assault rifles

References

External links

 AEK-971 on Vitaly V. Kuzmin Blog 
 AEK-971, AEK-972, AEK-973
 OJSC "ZID" — official page
Project "Abakan"
Энциклопедия Оружия
https://modernfirearms.net/en/assault-rifles/russia-assault-rifles/aek-971-eng/

5.45×39mm assault rifles
5.56×45mm NATO assault rifles
7.62×39mm assault rifles
Kalashnikov derivatives
Assault rifles of Russia
Assault rifles of the Soviet Union
Degtyarev Plant products